The Church of St Peter and St Paul is a Church of England parish church in Great Missenden, Buckinghamshire, England.

The church is Grade I listed.

The church dates mainly from the 14th century, heightened in the 15th century. The tower's asymmetrical lower level results from the tower's extension to the south after the Reformation, with a wall nearly 14 feet thick, to support a new belfry to house five bells moved from the dissolved Missenden Abbey. The church was restored, and the north-east aisle rebuilt, in 1899–1900 by John Oldrid Scott.

The church is built of flint rubble, with sarsen stone footings and some dressings, some roughcast, other dressings in ashlar.

The writer Roald Dahl, who lived in Gipsy House in Great Missenden, is buried in the churchyard.

There are two Commonwealth War Graves Commission memorials in the churchyard, marking the burial place of two British soldiers. They commemorate Rifleman Jeffrey James Whitney of the Rifle Brigade, who died in September 1940, age 20, and Major Basil Arthur Parnwell of the Royal Fusiliers (City of London Regiment), who died in July 1947.

See also
 Great Missenden War Memorial

References

External links
 

14th-century church buildings in England
Church of England church buildings in Buckinghamshire
Commonwealth War Graves Commission cemeteries in England
Grade I listed churches in Buckinghamshire
Saints Peter and Paul